Bakhtiyār (meaning "lucky"), alternatively spelt as "Bakhtyar", "Baxtiyar", "Bachtiar", "Bachtyar" and "Bahtiyar", is a Persian masculine given name and surname. Notable people with the name include:

Given name

Bahtiyar
 Bahtiyar Aydın (1946-1993), Turkish general
 Bahtiyar Can Vanlı (born 1962), Turkish-German football coach

Bakhtiyar 
Muhammad bin Bakhtiyar Khalji, Ghurid general in India under Qutb-ud-din Aibak
Bakhtiyar Kaki, a 13th-century Sufi 
Bakhtiyar Artayev, a Kazakh boxer
Bakhtiyar Akhmedov, a Russian wrestler
Bakhtiyar Vahabzadeh, an Azerbaijani poet
Bakhtiyar Musayev, an Azerbaijani footballer
Bakhtiyar Tuzmukhamedov, Russian international lawyer
Bakhtiyar Tyleganov, a Kazakh boxer
Bakhtiyar Zaynutdinov, a Kazakh footballer
Baxtiyor Rahimov, an Uzbek Islamist militant
Bakhtiyor Hamidullaev, an Uzbek football player
Bakhtiyar ibn Abu-Ja'far, an 11th-century local ruler of Semnan (under Ziyarids)
'Izz al-Dawla Bakhtiyar, a 10th-century Buyid Amir
Bakhtiyar ibn Hasanuya, a 10th-century Hasanuyid Amir
Bäxtiär Qanqayıv, an 18th-century Russian colonel (of Tatar origin)
Bakhtiar Amin, Iraqi Kurdish politician

Bachtiar
Bachtiar Aly, Indonesian Ambassador for Egypt from 2002–2005
Bachtiar Chamsyah, Indonesian politician
Bachtiar Effendi, Indonesian film actor and director

Bachtyar
Bachtyar Ali, Kurdish-Iraqi novelist and intellectual

Surname
Gulnazar, born Gülnezer Bextiyar, Chinese actress and model of Uyghur origin
Lailee Bakhtiar, American author and critic
Laleh Bakhtiar, Iranian-American author, translator and clinical psychologist
Rudi Bakhtiar, Iranian-American newswoman
Shapour Bakhtiar, Iranian politician and Prime Minister of Iran 
Teymur Bakhtiar, Iranian general and head of Savak
Akmal Bakhtiyarov, a Kazakh footballer

Persian masculine given names
Persian-language surnames